The 2021 Saxony-Anhalt state election was held on 6 June 2021 to elect the 8th Landtag of Saxony-Anhalt. The outgoing government was coalition of the Christian Democratic Union (CDU), Social Democratic Party (SPD), and The Greens, led by Minister-President Reiner Haseloff.

The CDU won an unexpectedly strong 37.1% of votes, an increase of 7.4 percentage points. The opposition Alternative for Germany (AfD) finished on 20.8%, a decline of 3.4 percentage points. The Left and SPD each suffered their worst ever results in the state, recording 11.0% and 8.4% respectively. The Free Democratic Party (FDP), which narrowly failed to re-enter the Landtag in 2016, won 6.4% of votes and 7 seats. The Greens finished on an unexpectedly low 5.9%, only a slight improvement from their previous result.

Going in to the election, the CDU trailed the AfD in some polls, with most others showing a neck-to-neck race, with the CDU sitting at around 30 % support. The unexpected CDU sweep – improving their 2016 result and winning a plurality in every district of the state, though they narrowly lost the Zeitz constituency – was largely attributed to the personal popularity of long-time Minister-President Haseloff, who, at the time, was the Minister-President with the highest favorability ratings. This allowed him to carry the CDU to victory against the poor showing in the polls of the federal CDU, largely resulting from developments in their campaign in the then-upcoming federal election. The AfDs leader Oliver Kirchner on the other hand was barely known to the public, with polls showing he would garner single-digit support if the Minister-President was elected directly.

On 6 July, the CDU, SPD, and FDP began coalition negotiations. The three parties presented a draft coalition agreement on 9 August, which was later approved by each party's membership. Haseloff was re-elected Minister-President on 16 September on the second ballot in the Landtag.

The coalition, dubbed "Germany coalition" due to the coalition parties colors, was übergroß, since the CDU and SPD alone would have held a single-seat majority in the Landtag. The last übergroß coalition, popular in times of crises, for example in West Berlin in the post-WWII years, was formed in Hamburg in 1970. The gamble paid off, since the Landtag didn't elect Haseloff on the first ballot, which some commentators attributed to right-wing dissent within the CDU faction.

Election date
The Landtag is elected for five years, with its term commencing when the new Landtag first meets. Election must take place between 58 and 62 months after the start of the legislative period. In November 2019, the state government announced that the election would take place on 6 June 2021.

Electoral system
The Landtag is elected via mixed-member proportional representation. 41 members are elected in single-member constituencies via first-past-the-post voting. 42 members are then allocated using compensatory proportional representation. Voters have two votes: the "first vote" for candidates in single-member constituencies, and the "second vote" for party lists, which are used to fill the proportional seats. The minimum size of the Landtag is 83 members, but if overhang seats are present, proportional leveling seats will be added to ensure proportionality. An electoral threshold of 5% of valid votes is applied to the Landtag; parties that fall below this threshold are ineligible to receive seats.

Background

In the previous election held on 13 March 2016, the CDU remained the largest party with 29.8% of votes cast, a decline of 2.7 percentage points. Alternative for Germany (AfD) contested its first election in Saxony-Anhalt, winning 24.3%. The Left fell from second to third place with 16.3%, a decline of 7.4 points. The SPD lost half its voteshare, falling to 10.6%. The Greens narrowly retained their seats with 5.2%.

The CDU had led a coalition with the SPD since 2011, but this government lost its majority in the election. The CDU subsequently formed a coalition with the SPD and Greens.

Parties
The table below lists parties which were represented in the 7th Landtag of Saxony-Anhalt.

Campaign

Lead candidates
On 10 July 2020, SPD parliamentary group leader Katja Pähle was elected as the SPD's lead candidate for the election, defeating challenger Roger Stöcker. In a vote by the party membership, Pähle won 834 votes (52.5%) to Stöcker's 652 (41.0%).

On 12 July 2020, The Left party executive nominated deputy Landtag leader Eva von Angern as their lead candidate for the election. Some within the party disapproved of the executive nominating a preferred nominee ahead of time, and desired an open contest between candidates at the conference. The party's district associations in Jerichower Land, Saalekreis, and Magdeburg signed an open letter expressing their disappointment. Party chairman Stefan Gebhardt stated he took the criticism seriously, and that the executive's announcement was simply a suggestion. Angern was elected as lead candidate with 85.6% of votes at a party conference on 30 January 2021.

On 5 September 2020, the Greens party congress elected Landtag group leader Cornelia Lüddemann as their lead candidate for the election.

On 21 September 2020, the CDU confirmed incumbent Minister-President Reiner Haseloff as its lead candidate. In prior months, state party leader Holger Stahlknecht had stated his desire to become top candidate if Haseloff chose not to seek another term as Minister-President. Stahlknecht affirmed his support for Haseloff after the September announcement.

The Free Democratic Party, which narrowly failed to enter the Landtag in 2016, elected deputy leader Lydia Hüskens as its lead candidate on 26 September 2020.

On 20 December 2020, AfD parliamentary group leader Oliver Kirchner was nominated as his party's lead candidate for the election. He ran unopposed, winning 361 of 416 votes at a party conference.

Opinion polling

Party polling

Minister-President polling

Preferred coalition

Position in government

Results

Aftermath
The CDU's clear victory was not predicted by opinion polling, which suggested that the party was likely to win a plurality, but would not exceed 30% of the vote. Likewise, the AfD and Greens did more poorly than expected. Off the heels of poor results in the March state elections, the result was perceived as a success for the CDU nationally. However, commentators pointed to the personal popularity of Minister-President Haseloff, who they noted had distanced himself from federal chairman Armin Laschet, endorsing rival Markus Söder during the contest for the Chancellor candidacy in April. In addition, the Saxony-Anhalt branch of AfD is considered to be quite extreme even by national party's standards and had been under surveillance since June 2021.

The incumbent governing "Kenya coalition" of the CDU, SPD, and Greens was returned with an increased majority of 55 seats; the CDU and SPD alone held a slim majority of 49 seats. Other options included a "Jamaica coalition" of the CDU, FDP, and Greens (53 seats), as well as the previously untested "Germany coalition" of the CDU, SPD, and FDP (56 seats). Minister-President Haseloff stated that he would hold government discussions with "all democratic parties", and ruled out a coalition with the AfD or The Left.

Government formation
The Greens ruled out renewing their coalition with the CDU and SPD, stating that they did not wish to enter a government in which they were not mathematically necessary. The SPD demanded that the next government implement free daycare and provide more funds for municipalities or hospitals where possible. The FDP demanded a reduction of bureaucracy in order to streamline the procurement law.

On 7 July, the CDU, SPD, and FDP announced they would enter negotiations for a coalition government. On 9 August, the three parties announced that a draft coalition agreement had been finalised.

All three parties held membership ballots to approve the agreement. On 4 September, the SPD announced that the agreement had been passed with 63.4% approval. This was followed on 10 September by approval from 92.1% of CDU members and 98% of FDP members.

On 16 September, the Landtag re-elected Haseloff as Minister-President and invested his new cabinet. Haseloff unexpectedly failed to be elected on the first ballot, winning only 48 of the necessary 49 votes. His coalition holds 56 seats in total. On the second ballot, he was elected with 53 votes in favour to 43 against, with one abstention.

Notes

References

2021 elections in Germany
2021 state election
2021
June 2021 events in Germany
Opinion polling in Germany